Tundra is a bulk carrier. She was launched in 2009. The maritime site boatnerd reports she is operated by Navarone SA of Limassol, Cyprus, and leased to Canfornav Incorporated of Montreal, the Canadian Forest Navigation Group.  Marine Link however reports that she is owned by Canfornav.

Early in the morning of June 21, 2015, after delivering a cargo of raw sugar to the Redpath Sugar Refinery in Toronto, she ran aground near the western end of the St Lawrence Seaway.

According to the Times Colonist, following an earlier grounding in the Seaway in 2012, Transportation Safety Board accident investigators concluded there had been "fatigue and ineffective communication between the pilot and bridge officers." Marine Link noted that the 1 am grounding occurred hours after the Seaway was re-opened after the French cruise ship  forced a closure by colliding with the Eisenhower Lock.

Tundra is one of a class of sixteen vessels.

Description
The ship has a gross tonnage (GT) of 19,647 and a deadweight tonnage (DWT) of 30,930.

References

2009 ships
Bulk carriers